The 1st Battalion, 28th Marines (1/28) is an inactive infantry battalion of the United States Marine Corps. They were part of the 28th Marine Regiment and 5th Marine Division and fought during the Battle of Iwo Jima in World War II.

Unit awards
Presidential Unit Citation, 19-28 February 1945, Iwo Jima

Notable former members
William G. Harrell, recipient of the Medal of Honor
Tony Stein, recipient of the Medal of Honor

See also
History of the United States Marine Corps
List of United States Marine Corps battalions

References

Infantry battalions of the United States Marine Corps
Inactive units of the United States Marine Corps